Chasin' Crazy is an American country music group composed of Landon Parker (acoustic guitar, vocals), Travis Fincher (drums, vocals), Jimmy James Hunter (lead guitar, vocals), Creigh Riepe (keyboards, guitar, vocals) and Forest Miller (bass, fiddle, mandolin, vocals). The group was formed in Nashville, Tennessee in 2012. They signed to RPM Entertainment and released their debut single, "That's How We Do Summertime", in May 2014. The song was written by Thomas Matthew Karlas and Matthew Thomas Ramsey and produced by Marti Frederiksen and Blake Chancey.

Markos Papadatos of Digital Journal gave "That's How We Do Summertime" four stars out of five. Papadatos called it "the quintessential summer anthem," writing that "the song has a liberating theme to it" and "the harmonies and backing vocals in the song are quite infectious." The song also received a favorable review from Taste of Country, stating that it is "infectious and up-tempo, distinguishing their country-pop sound from other three-plus outfits." The review went on to say that "the lyrics may lean generic, but a sweet guitar melody and strong vocal harmonies carry the song through" and "Parker’s got a strong voice to lead the track, although all five guys share singing duties during each chorus."

"That's How We Do Summertime" debuted at number 59 on the Billboard Country Airplay chart for the week of May 31, 2014 and charted for thirteen weeks, peaking at number 47 for the week of August 9. A music video for the song was released on August 12. Chasin' Crazy released their second single, "Smack Dab", in August. Both songs will be included on an extended play to be released in early 2015.

A reality show about the band, also called Chasin' Crazy, premiered on Great American Country on October 11, 2014.

Discography

Singles

Music videos

References

External links

Country music groups from Tennessee
Musical groups established in 2012
Musical groups from Nashville, Tennessee
2012 establishments in Tennessee